The Dawn is the first album by the Filipino rock band the Dawn released on June 20, 1987.

The songs "Dreams", "Give Me the Night", "Mad Game", "Behind Shadows" and "Enveloped Ideas" were performed at Concert at the Park in Luneta. "Dreams" was written by the guitarist Teddy Diaz with the band's manager Martin Galan. The intro to "Susi" has a bassline by Carlos Balcells.

Track listing

Personnel
The Dawn
Teddy Diaz — lead guitar, backing vocals, keyboards
JB Leonor — drums, keyboards
Jett Pangan — lead vocals, keyboards, guitar
Carlos Balcells — bass guitar

Additional personnel and production
Pablo Molina — lead vocal introduction on "Enveloped Ideas"
Isabel Yotoko — backing vocals
Henry Toribio — backing vocals, assisting 
Bob Guzman — producer
Jose Mari Gonzales — producer on "Enveloped Ideas"
Rick Santos & Oscar Mallari — engineer
Nonie Tabios — assistant engineer
Recorded at: Cinema Audio inc.
Assistant Engineer: Nonie Tabios

References

The Dawn (band) albums
1987 debut albums
PolyEast Records albums